Tongchuan Road is an interchange station of the Line 15 and  Line 14 of the Shanghai Metro. Located at the intersection of Daduhe Road and Tongchuan Road in the city's Putuo District, the station was scheduled to open in 2020, when both lines were expected to begin operations. However, the station eventually opened on 23 January 2021 following a one-month postponement of the line 15. The station later became an interchange after Line 14 opened on 30 December 2021.

Station Layout

References 

Railway stations in Shanghai
Shanghai Metro stations in Putuo District
Line 14, Shanghai Metro
Line 15, Shanghai Metro
Railway stations in China opened in 2021